Christopher Scott Gragg (born February 28, 1972) is a former American football offensive tackle in the National Football League. He played college football at the University of Montana, where he majored in mathematics and made 82 knockdown blocks while grading 89 percent for blocking consistency as a senior. He was drafted in the 1995 NFL Draft by the New York Giants and later played for the San Francisco 49ers and the New York Jets.

He coached varsity football and taught math at his alma mater Silverton High School from 2006-2010. Scott earned his Master of Arts in Teaching degree in 2008 at George Fox University. He became the tight ends coach and recruiting coordinator at his other alma mater, the University of Montana, in 2010.

He currently works at McNary High School as an athletic director.

References

1972 births
Living people
American football offensive tackles
Montana Grizzlies football players
New York Jets players
New York Giants players
San Francisco 49ers players
People from Silverton, Oregon
Players of American football from Oregon
George Fox University alumni